Gypsy is the soundtrack to the 1993 television adaptation of Gypsy. It was released by Atlantic Records on November 23, 1993 in the United States. Based on the autobiography of Gypsy Rose Lee and the 1959 musical Gypsy: A Musical Fable, written by Jule Styne and Stephen Sondheim, it depicts the life and times of a burlesque stripper and her domineering mother, starring Bette Midler as Mama Rose.

Despite the fact that the film only aired on the CBS network in the US and the soundtrack only featured Midler on seven of the seventeen tracks, it was released as a Bette Midler album by Atlantic Records. The soundtrack peaked at number 183 on US Billboard 200 but failed to chart elsewhere.

Critical reception
AllMusic editor William Ruhlmann found that Midler "was too accustomed to being ingratiating and sympathetic to be as much of a monster as Rose is supposed to be, and she didn't quite have the voice for the more demanding songs [...] In the more confrontational numbers, such as "Some People" and "Everything's Coming Up Roses," she didn't go far enough [...] On the whole, then, Midler did a respectable job, but not the one she was capable of, if she had worked harder. As such, this Gypsy, while a vast improvement over the disastrous movie soundtrack, was on a par with the Tyne Daly revival."

Track listing

Personnel
Musicians

 Lacey Chabert – vocals (Baby June)
 Elisabeth Moss – vocals (Baby Louise)
 Bette Midler – vocals (Rose)
 Peter Riegert – vocals (Herbie)
 Joey Ceo – vocals (newsboy)
 Blake Armstrong – vocals (newsboy)
 Teo Weiner – vocals (newsboy)
 Jeffrey Broadhurst – vocals (Tulsa)
 Peter Lockyer – vocals (Yonkers)
 Michael Moore – vocals (L.A.)
 Patrick Boyd – vocals (Kansas)
 Cynthia Gibb – vocals (Louise/Gypsy)
 Jennifer Beck – vocals (June) 
 Terry Lindholm – vocals (Flagstaff)
 Gregg Russell – vocals (farmboy)
 Linda Hart – vocals (Mazeppa)
 Anna McNeely – vocals (Electra)
 Christine Ebersole – vocals (Tessie Tura)

Production

 Arif Mardin – record producer
 Michael Rafter – producer
 Curt Sobel – producer
 Robert Schaper Jr – sound engineer
 David Ronne – engineer
 Matthew John McFadden – engineer
 Peggy Names – engineer
 Recorded at Capitol Studios, Hollywood, California

Charts

References

Albums produced by Arif Mardin
Bette Midler soundtracks
1993 soundtrack albums
Film soundtracks
Atlantic Records soundtracks
Musical film soundtracks